Mycalesis francisca is an East Palearctic species of satyrine butterfly found in China, Japan, Assam, Burma and Indochina

The larva feeds on Imperata cylindrica, Miscanthus sinensis, Setaria palmifolia and Oplismenus undulatifolius

Subspecies
M. f. francisca
M. f. ulia Fruhstorfer, 1908 (northern Vietnam)
M. f. formosana Fruhstorfer, 1908 (Taiwan)
M. f. sanatana Moore, [1858] (India to Burma, Thailand, Laos, South Yunnan)
M. f. albofasciata Tytler, 1914 (Manipur, Burma, Northwest Yunnan)
M. f. arisana Sonan, 1931 (Taiwan)
M. f. perdiccas Hewitson, [1862] (Japan)

References

External links
Images representing Mycalesis at Consortium for the Barcode of Life

Mycalesis
Butterflies described in 1780